Stepping Stones is a 1931 British musical film directed by Geoffrey Benstead. It was made at Isleworth Studios as a quota quickie. It is a revue-style show featuring a number of music hall performers.

Cast
 Jade Hales as Lady  
 George Bellamy as John  
 Ethel Lodge as Joan 
 Charles Paton as Suger Daddy  
 Henderson and Lennox as Cabaret Boys 
 Celia Bird as Romany Lady  
 Pearl Hay P as Crinoline Baby  
 Fred Rains 
 Marguerite Allan 
 Heather Thatcher
 Alec Alexander as Bandleader

References

Bibliography
 Chibnall, Steve. Quota Quickies: The Birth of the British 'B' Film. British Film Institute, 2007.
 Low, Rachael. Filmmaking in 1930s Britain. George Allen & Unwin, 1985.
 Wood, Linda. British Films, 1927-1939. British Film Institute, 1986.

External links

1931 films
British musical films
1931 musical films
Films shot at Isleworth Studios
Quota quickies
British black-and-white films
1930s English-language films
1930s British films